Dr. Eric Widmer (born in Beirut) is an American scholar and educator. He was born in Lebanon where his American mother was on the faculty of the American University in Beirut. He was educated at Deerfield, Williams, and Harvard. After finishing his Ph.D, he joined the faculty at Brown teaching Chinese History and would then go on to spend much of his career there as a dean. He then served as Deerfield Academy's 54th Headmaster from 1994 to 2006, and was succeeded in that post by Margarita O'Byrne Curtis. He left the school to assume the position of founding headmaster at King's Academy in Madaba, Jordan, which began its first academic year in fall 2007. He speaks six languages including French and Chinese.

He is married to Dr. Meera Viswanathan, a longstanding member of the East Asian studies and comparative literature departments at Brown University, who now serves as Head of School at the Ethel Walker School.

His mother, Carolyn Ladd Widmer, was the first Dean of the University of Connecticut School of Nursing (1942–1967).

References

People from Beirut
Deerfield Academy alumni
Harvard University alumni
20th-century births
Heads of Deerfield Academy
Williams College alumni
Brown University faculty
American expatriates in Lebanon
American expatriates in Jordan
Living people
Year of birth missing (living people)